Maybury State Park is a state park in Northville Township, Wayne County, Michigan composed of  of gently rolling terrain, open meadow, and mature forest. The park gives people in the nearby metropolitan area an opportunity to get involved in outdoor recreation activities in a state park setting. Lying adjacent to the park, Maybury Farm is operated as a separate facility by the Northville Community Foundation.

History
Long before the park became a haven for picnickers, the isolated woods and farm fields held more than 40 buildings—infirmaries, houses, children's playgrounds and school—in a quarantined city for thousands of Detroit's highly infectious tuberculosis, at the time often called consumption, patients. Wealthy retired real estate tycoon William H. Maybury spearheaded Detroit's construction of the facility so thousands of TB sufferers could be removed from the city, and where the beautiful surroundings might help nurse some back to health. Most of the buildings were torn down before the land became Wayne County's first state park in 1975. Many of Maybury's paved walking trails are on former walks and roadways, although just four stone and brick doctors' residences remain, including one that serves as park headquarters.

In 2003 the DNR asked the Northville Community Foundation to take over the operations of the Maybury Farm, which had been closed in 2002. An agreement was reached and the farm reopened in September 2005. In February 2003, a fire destroyed the main barns, some of the farm's equipment and killed many of the farm's animals. A public fundraising campaign led to the rebuilding of the farm including moving 125-year-old barns from a nearby town.

Activities and amenities
The state park offers pond fishing, picnicking, playgrounds, stables, and many miles of trails for hiking, biking, cross-country skiing, and equestrian use. Maybury Farm provides educational programming, sheep shearing, hay rides, corn maze, and other public farming demonstrations.

References

External links

Maybury State Park Michigan Department of Natural Resources
Maybury State Park Map Michigan Department of Natural Resources
Friends of Maybury State Park
Maybury Farm Northville Community Foundation

State parks of Michigan
Protected areas of Wayne County, Michigan
Protected areas established in 1971
1971 establishments in Michigan
IUCN Category III